The Institute of Nuclear Medicine, Oncology and Radiotherapy (or INOR) is located inside premises of Ayub Teaching Hospital Abbottabad, Khyber Pakhtunkhwa, Pakistan. The facility is one of 18 cancer hospitals operated by the Pakistan Atomic Energy Commission or PAEC. The PAEC has made a priority to apply nuclear technology in order to improve Pakistan's health sector. INOR patients receive state-of-the-art diagnostic and treatment either free of charge or at subsidized rates and is also involved in the "National Cancer Awareness & Prevention Program"

See also 
 Ayub Teaching Hospital
 Pakistan Atomic Energy Commission
 Institute of Radiotherapy and Nuclear Medicine

External links 
Pakistan Atomic Energy Commission
Ayub Medical College
Ayub Alumni Website

References

Nuclear medicine organizations
Medical and health organisations based in Pakistan
Nuclear technology in Pakistan
Constituent institutions of Pakistan Atomic Energy Commission
Hospitals in Khyber Pakthunkhwa
Cancer hospitals in Pakistan
Buildings and structures in Abbottabad